Edinburg North High School (commonly ENHS, Edinburg North, or North) is a public secondary school in Edinburg, Texas, United States, serving students in grades 9–12. The school is part of the Edinburg Consolidated Independent School District, with admission based primarily on the locations of students' homes. ENHS' mascot is the common 
Cougar, and their colors are navy and gold.

The school serves, in addition to northern Edinburg, the census-designated places of Faysville, Hargill, and Linn, as well as the rural parts of far northern Hidalgo County. The University of Texas Rio Grande Valley (UTRGV)'s Edinburg campus is also zoned into ENHS. 

District expansion circa 2010 has added a performing arts center to each of ECISD's high schools (all completed November 2010), including at Edinburg North.

References

External links
 

Buildings and structures in Edinburg, Texas
Edinburg Consolidated Independent School District high schools
Education in Edinburg, Texas